Bus Projects Inc. is an independent, not-for-profit artist run initiative located at Collingwood Yards, Collingwood, Australia. Bus Projects is dedicated to supporting the critical, conceptual and interdisciplinary practices of Australian artists. In addition to its core gallery-based program of exhibitions, events and residencies, Bus Projects collaborates with a range of artists and arts organisations to produce projects off-site and within the public realm. Bus Projects has been operating for over 10 years, during which time it has presented new work from more than 700 artists, hosted live performances and professional development workshops for artists, and produced a series of CDs called Outer, featuring the work of national and international sound artists.

History 
Founded as Bus by Tim O'Donoghue and Kade McDonald in August 2001, it was originally located at 117 Little Lonsdale St. Bus began as a design collective whose members held a shared interest in art "...it was just a collective of people that decided that a gallery, as something that joined onto everybody else's practices, was a good idea." The first exhibition held at Bus the work of the advisory board to the gallery, featuring the artists Nick Mangan, Jo Scicluna, Renee So as well as Selina Ou, Luke Adams, Chad Chatterton, Julian Oliver and Mark Harwood. The gallery had three exhibition spaces known as the Skinny Gallery, Main Gallery and the Sound Gallery. It also had a project space that hosted artist residencies and performances.

In 2007, the artist, Claire Mooney replaced Tim O'Donoghue as the gallery director and in February 2008, Bus incorporated and became officially known as Bus Gallery Inc. In November 2008, the artist Tim Webster became the gallery director and in December 2008, Bus Gallery Inc. formally changed its name to Bus Projects Inc. in order to reflect the group's focus on spatial arts practice. In 2009, a new exhibition space dedicated to video projections was opened in the renovated stairwell of the building. Throughout 2009, Bus Projects was also home to the bookshop, Sunshine and Grease, operated by Patrick O'Brien.

In January 2010, Bus Projects was notified of the building owner's intention to use the gallery as temporary offices until a full redevelopment of the site. In March 2010, Bus Projects moved out of the building at 117 Little Lonsdale Street. Throughout 2010, Bus Projects presented a series of off-site events, including The Sound Playground and Play With Your Food in conjunction with other arts groups until relocating to Donkey Wheel House in early 2011. In 2013 the organisation relocated to new gallery premises in Collingwood, located on the ground floor of 25 – 31 Rokeby Street, Collingwood, a former paint factory that has been transformed & redesigned by John Wardle Architects. 

In 2020, Bus Projects moved into Collingwood Yards, a new, permanent and affordable home for scores of artists and independent arts organisations working across music, visual arts, performance, digital media, creative industries and beyond. Situated across the former Collingwood Technical School campus, Collingwood Yards spans over 6500sqm. The site consists of three buildings and a leafy central courtyard and is located in one of Australia’s most diverse, rapidly transforming and dense inner city neighbourhoods.

See also 
Australian Artist Run Initiatives
Artist Run Initiative

Notes

References 
Heagney, D ed. Making Space VIA-N 2007, p. 78,

External links 
Bus Projects Inc. Website
Crawl: Event Listings and news for Artist Run Initiatives in Australia
Collingwood Yards

Artist-run centres
2001 establishments in Australia